CLTS can refer to:

Center for Transnational Legal Studies, a joint venture between ten leading law schools from around the world, instituting a global educational center for the study of transnational law
Community-led total sanitation, an approach to achieve sustained behavior change leading to abandonment of open defecation practices